Chengbei is a township of Anyue County in eastern Sichuan province, China, situated immediately north of the county seat. , it has 13 villages under its administration.

See also 
 List of township-level divisions of Sichuan

References 

Township-level divisions of Sichuan
Anyue County